Wittmackia carvalhoi is a species of flowering plant in the family Bromeliaceae, endemic to Brazil (the state of Bahia). It was first described in 1987 as Ronnbergia carvalhoi.

References

Bromelioideae
Flora of Brazil
Plants described in 1987